The Antioquia Batholith (Ksta, Kqd, K2ba) is a cluster of plutons located in and named after Antioquia, Colombia. The development of this weathering is attributed to the humid climate and to stable conditions with limited amounts of erosion. Where the batholith-derived saprolite is eroded, inselbergs, such as El Peñón de Guatapé, crop out. Inselbergs correspond to rock masses of the batholith that resisted weathering and erosion by being less fractured.

Etymology 
The batholith was named after Antioquia by Botero in 1942, after various authors as Boussignault in 1825, Ospina in 1911, Scheibe in 1933 and Posada in 1936 mentioned its existence.

Geology 
The batholith varies in composition between hornblende-biotite tonalite to granodiorite, with lateral variations between gabbro to granite. Common minerals are hornblende, quartz, plagioclase, K-feldspar, biotite and amphibole, with traces of epidote, chlorite and sphene. The batholith underlies the municipalities San Andrés de Cuerquia, San José de la Montaña, in the east of San Jerónimo, around Belmira, in Don Matías, Girardota, Gómez Plata, Entrerríos, Carolina del Príncipe, Barbosa, Santo Domingo, and Santa Rosa de Osos. Because of profound weathering, outcrops are scarce and restricted to riverbeds, and at El Peñón de Guatapé. To the northwest of the urban center of Santa Rosa de los Osos, bauxite mineralizations of the batholith are found.

Origin 
The batholith intruded the Triassic San Isidro Granulite, Ceja Gneiss and Medellín Amphibolite, schists of the Valdivia Group, and migmatites of the Ayura Montebello Group. Xenoliths of those host rocks in which the batholith intruded consist of quartz-mica schists, amphibolites and gneisses. In certain places, the batholith is overlain by the El Vergel Beds, alluvium and other Quaternary deposits.

Tectonics 
In Belmira, the Río Chico Fault places the Medellín Dunite against the Antioquia Batholith. The Otú-Pericos Fault places the Antioquia Batholith in contact with the Jurassic Segovia Batholith. The Espíritu Santo Fault runs just north of the batholith near San Andrés de Cuerquia. Other faults cross-cutting the batholith are:
 Balseadero Fault
 Biscocho Fault
 Caldera Fault
 Miraflores Fault
 Monteloro Fault
 Nare Fault

Age 
A 2019 summary of ages obtained for the batholith show that the batholith formed in a protracted manner from 97 to 58 million years ago (Ma), that is from the Late Cretaceous to the Paleocene. For the main part of the intrusion there is a best estimate of the age between 71 ± 1.2 and 77 ± 1.7 Ma, suggesting an intrusion age near the boundary of the Campanian and Maastrichtian.

Hydrology 

The Medellín River cross-cuts the batholith from southwest to northeast, where it flows in the Porce River. The following reservoirs are situated entirely on the batholith:
 Miraflores Reservoir
 Las Playas Reservoir
 Guatapé Reservoir
 Río Grande Reservoir
 San Lorenzo Reservoir
 Troneras Reservoir

References

Bibliography

Maps 
 
 
 
 

Batholith, Antioquia
Batholiths of South America
Late Cretaceous South America
Cretaceous Colombia
Cretaceous magmatism
Campanian Stage
Batholith, Antioquia